This is a list of museums in Jersey, Channel Islands.

The list

Museums

Jersey
Jersey
Museums